Madura Lakmal (born 21 July 1985) is a Sri Lankan former cricketer. He played in 84 first-class and 60 List A matches between 2003/04 and 2018/19. He made his Twenty20 debut on 17 August 2004, for Panadura Sports Club in the 2004 SLC Twenty20 Tournament. In March 2007, he was part of the Sri Lanka Cricket Academy squad that played in triangular tournament against Pakistan and Bangladesh in Bangladesh. In 2012, he also played for Clifton Cricket Club in the Central Lancashire Cricket League in England.

References

External links
 

1985 births
Living people
Sri Lankan cricketers
Moors Sports Club cricketers
Panadura Sports Club cricketers
Ragama Cricket Club cricketers
Sebastianites Cricket and Athletic Club cricketers
Sinhalese Sports Club cricketers
Place of birth missing (living people)